SPEP may refer to:
Serum protein electrophoresis (SPEP or SPE) 
Society for Phenomenology and Existential Philosophy
Puerto Esperanza Airport (ICAO: SPEP)